Gnorismoneura taeniodesma is a moth of the family Tortricidae. It is found in China.

The wingspan is 16.5–18 mm for females.

References

Moths described in 1934
Archipini